Jacob VanDoren House, also known as "Allen Dale," is a historic home located near Martinsburg, Berkeley County, West Virginia. It was built between 1830 and 1836, and is a -story, stucco coated stone house in the Greek Revival style.  It has a hip roof with balustraded deck and measures 49 feet wide by 44 feet deep.  It features a one-story, one bay, entrance porch with a hip roof supported by Ionic order columns.

It was listed on the National Register of Historic Places in 1984.

References

Houses on the National Register of Historic Places in West Virginia
Greek Revival houses in West Virginia
Houses completed in 1836
Houses in Berkeley County, West Virginia
National Register of Historic Places in Berkeley County, West Virginia
Stone houses in West Virginia
1836 establishments in Virginia